The Taça Salutaris, was the first interstate clubs competition realized in Brazil, between São Paulo champions and Rio de Janeiro champions. The name of the trophy was in honor of a bottler of mineral waters that financed the competition.

Participants

Matches

See also

Taça dos Campeões Estaduais
Taça Ioduran

References  

1911 in Brazilian football
Defunct football competitions in Brazil